Hardanger Arbeiderblad was a Norwegian newspaper, published in Odda in Hordaland county.

Hardanger Arbeiderblad was started in 1919 as Hardanger Social-Demokrat. Its name was changed in 1923, the same year as a faction of the Labour Party left social democracy to form the Communist Party of Norway. It was published once a week, but from mid-1927 twice a week. It was closed after its last issue on 14 August 1940 due to the German occupation of Norway. It returned in 1946, as a common project for the Labour and Communist parties, but went defunct in 1949. In the general election the same year the Communist Party had dropped from 11 to 0 seats in Parliament.

The first editor was Edvard Jørstad. Among the later editors was Harald Slåttelid.

References

1919 establishments in Norway
1949 disestablishments in Norway
Communist Party of Norway newspapers
Defunct newspapers published in Norway
Mass media in Hordaland
Norwegian-language newspapers
Odda
Newspapers established in 1919
Publications disestablished in 1940
Publications established in 1946
Publications disestablished in 1949
Defunct weekly newspapers